was a Japanese-German pianist, a revelation in her country in the late 1990s, well known in classical music both through CD recordings and public performances, in particular of piano concertos in disguise, transcriptions of known masterpieces for chamber ensemble.

Biography
She began studying piano in her native Tokyo before she was four years old, and when she was six her family moved to Germany. She studied in Essen, Detmold and Hannover. Even though born Japanese and though the Japanese culture is very well known to her, she describes herself as European and considers Germany as her homeland.

In her training, she studied piano with Detlef Kraus (Folkwang Hochschule), Friedrich Wilhelm Schnurr (Hochschule für Musik Detmold) and Vladimir Krainev (Hochschule für Musik und Theater Hannover) and graduated in 1995 with the highest honors: she achieved the highest distinction in her soloist examinations. Additional training came from international masterclasses with Nikita Magaloff, Yara Bernette, Jeremy Menuhin, Paul Badura-Skoda and Edith Picht-Axenfeld and from the Polish pedagogue Malgorzata Botor-Schreiber.

Fumiko Shiraga has performed as a solo artist and with orchestras, as well as with chamber music ensembles. She has been instrumental in the revival of the transcriptions (for flute, violin, violoncello and piano), by Johann Nepomuk Hummel, of some of the Mozart piano concertos. She recorded the two Piano Concertos by Chopin in a piano and string quintet transcription (1997) and then, in 2001 and in a similar arrangement, she recorded Beethoven's First and Second piano concertos, as well as piano music by Bruckner, including a piano arrangement of his seventh symphony.

The last twenty years she lived in Hamburg, where she died of breast cancer after a long fight against the disease in January 2017 just about four weeks after her last concert.

Awards and distinctions
Several first prizes at the Young Musician’s Competition, the special prize at the International Schubert Competition in Dortmund in 1989; a scholarship from the Stendal Music Foundation In 1992, a prize (1993) at the International Chopin Competition in Göttingen, a new scholarship (1995) from Deutscher Musikrat (German Music Council, a member of the International Music Council) in Bonn and acceptance into the 40th National Selection of "Concerts by Young Artists" (1996).

Her CD with the Mozart piano concertos 22 and 26 was selected as Editor's Choice in January 2006, and in the same year her last CD of the Mozart-Hummel series, with the piano concerto No. 18 and the 40th Symphony was selected as CD of the month by Piano News.

Discography
 Beethoven: Piano Concertos Nos. 1 & 2 (Chamber version)
 Fumiko Shiraga - piano
 Orchestra/Ensemble: The Bremen String Soloists
 Bruckner: Piano Works
 Fumiko Shiraga - piano
 Chopin: Piano Concertos Nos. 1 and 2, Chamber version
 Fumiko Shiraga - piano
 Jan-Inge Haukås - double bass 
 Orchestra/Ensemble:  Yggdrasil Quartet
 Mozart: Piano Concertos Nos. 10 and 24 (arr. Hummel for chamber ensemble)
 Fumiko Shiraga - piano
 Henrik Wiese - flute
 Peter Clemente - violin
 Tibor Bényi - cello
 Mozart: Piano Concertos Nos. 20 and 25 (arr. Hummel for chamber ensemble)
 Fumiko Shiraga - piano
 Henrik Wiese - flute
 Peter Clemente - violin
 Tibor Bényi - cello
 Mozart: Piano Concerto No. 18 / Symphony No. 40 (arr. Hummel for chamber ensemble)
 Fumiko Shiraga - piano
 Henrik Wiese - flute
 Peter Clemente - violin
 Tibor Bényi - cello
 Mozart: Piano Concertos Nos. 26 and 22 (arr. Hummel for chamber ensemble)
 Fumiko Shiraga - piano
 Henrik Wiese - flute
 Peter Clemente - violin
 Tibor Bényi - cello

References

External links 
Official website 

1967 births
2017 deaths
Musicians from Tokyo
Japanese classical pianists
Japanese women pianists
Women classical pianists
German classical pianists
German women pianists
German people of Japanese descent
Japanese emigrants to Germany
Naturalized citizens of Germany
Hochschule für Musik, Theater und Medien Hannover alumni
Deaths from cancer in Germany
Deaths from breast cancer